Antipater of Tyre (fl. 1st century BC) was a Greek Stoic philosopher and a friend of Cato the Younger and Cicero.

Life
Antipater lived after, or was at least younger than, Panaetius. Cicero, in speaking of him, says, that he died "recently at Athens", which must mean shortly before 45 BC. He is mentioned by Strabo as a "famous philosopher" from Tyre. Antipater is said to have befriended Cato when Cato was a young man, and introduced him to Stoic philosophy:

Works
Little is known about his writings. From Cicero we can perhaps infer that Antipater, like Panaetius, wrote a work On Duties:

Diogenes Laërtius refers to another work by him called On the Cosmos:

Notes

Hellenistic-era philosophers from Asia
Stoic philosophers
1st-century BC philosophers
Year of birth unknown
People from Tyre, Lebanon
40s BC deaths